The Haleshwar Sthan is a Hindu pilgrimage site in Sitamarhi in the state of Bihar,India, which has an ancient Hindu temple. It is situated 3 km north-west of Sitamarhi town.

Haleshwar Sthan is one of the holiest Hindu temples dedicated to the god Shiva. Millions of pilgrims visit the temple every year, making it amongst the most visited religious shrines in northern India.

As the myth goes, King Videha  founded a temple of Lord Shiva on the occasion of Putra Yeshti Yajna. His temple was named Haleshwarnath temple.

Daily Bus service by Mahavir Mandir Trusts in morning leaves from Punaura Dham to Haleshwar Sthan, Panthpakar and Janakpur Temple Nepal and return in evening at Punaura Dham.

References 

Hindu temples in Bihar
Sitamarhi district
Shiva temples in Bihar
17th-century Hindu temples
Hindu pilgrimage sites in India